Daniel Muñoz de la Nava (born 29 January 1982 in Madrid, Spain) is a Spanish professional tennis player.

He reached the quarterfinals of Estoril in 2012 and Delray Beach in 2013, both as a qualifier.

ATP career finals

Doubles: 1 (1 runner-up)

ATP Challenger and ITF Futures finals

Singles: 34 (11–23)

Doubles: 38 (23–15)

Performance timeline

Singles

Notes

References

External links
 
 

Living people
1982 births
Spanish male tennis players
Hopman Cup competitors
Tennis players from Madrid
21st-century Spanish people